The acrobatic gymnastics tournaments at the 2017 World Games in Wrocław was played between 24 and 26 July. 78 acrobatic gymnastics competitors, from 13 nations, participated in the tournament. The acrobatic gymnastics competition took place at Centennial Hall in Lower Silesian Voivodeship.

Qualification

Qualification was based on the results of the 2016 Acrobatic Gymnastics World Championships, held in Putian, China, from 1 to 3 April 2016.

At the end of the qualification round, the top five countries in each category will have earned places to compete in Wroclaw, with a maximum of one place per country. An additional berth in each discipline may be attributed by the FIG Executive Committee following the competition to assure host country participation or continental representation.

Schedule

Participating nations
Poland, as the host country, receives a guaranteed spot, in case it were not to earn one by the regular qualifying methods.

Medal table

Events

Men's events

Women's events

Mixed events

See also
Gymnastics at the 2016 Summer Olympics

References

External links
 Fédération Internationale de Gymnastique
 Gymnastics on IWGA website
 Schedule
 Entry list
 Medalists
 Medals standing
 Results book

 
2017 World Games
World Games
2017
International gymnastics competitions hosted by Poland